The Azuero parakeet (Pyrrhura eisenmanni), also known as the Azuero conure, is a parrot that inhabits the Azuero Peninsula of Panama. Formerly classified as a subspecies of the painted parakeet, it is now considered its own species. The Azuero parakeet prefers humid, hilly, and forested areas. It feeds on fruits, flowers, seeds, algae, and invertebrates. The Azuero parakeet prefers to stay in flocks of around 20 individuals. It prefers to stay high up in forest canopies.

References

Birds of Panama
eisenmanni
Birds described in 1985